Morden is a city located in the Pembina Valley region of southern Manitoba, Canada near the United States border. Morden, which is surrounded by the Rural Municipality of Stanley, is the eighth largest and fastest-growing city in Manitoba. According to Statistics Canada, the city had a population of 9,929 in 2021, an increase of 14.5% from 2016, making it Manitoba's fastest growing city.

History

Morden was founded in 1882, when the Canadian Pacific Railway built a railway line crossing the Dead Horse Creek (called Le Cheval Mort by the French fur traders) at a place then known as Cheval. This spot became a popular resting place as it was ideal to provide water for drinking and locomotives. The settlement was renamed "Morden", after Alvey Morden, on whose family's land the community was established. Morden was incorporated as a municipality on January 1, 1882. The Manitoba government granted Morden town status in 1903 and later city status in 2012.

Geography

Climate
Morden has a humid continental climate (Köppen climate classification Dfb, USDA Plant Hardiness Zone 3a) with hot summers and cold winters. Since the Morden area experiences some of the warmest temperatures in Manitoba, it has become a centre for agricultural and horticultural research. Since 1915, the city has been home to the Morden Research and Development Centre, which is operated by the Government of Canada.

Demographics

Arts and culture

Morden is home to the largest collection of marine reptile fossils in Canada, located at the Canadian Fossil Discovery Centre. Their collection includes a 13-metre-long, 80 million year old mosasaur; it is a Guinness Record holder as the largest mosasaur on public display.

Pembina Hills Art Gallery is located in Morden.

In 2008, Morden was designated a "Cultural Capital" by the Minister of Canadian Heritage and Status of Women in 2008 for its emphasis on art and culture. This includes hosting various festivals such as the Back Forty Festival, which highlights aboriginal influences in the community. Award money was spent on a new performing arts centre, and four murals.

Corn and Apple Festival

Morden holds the Corn and Apple Festival each August. Founded in 1967, the festival includes free corn and apple cider, and celebrates a fruit and vegetable that thrive in Morden's long growing season. Notable entertainers at past festivals include Prairie Oyster, Colin James, Dr. Hook, Randy Bachman, The Trews, Chad Brownlee, and Rick Mercer.

Morden's quaint and historic downtown was featured in the 2020 TV series Tales from the Loop by Amazon Prime Video  and the 2022 Hallmark Channel TV film Pumpkin Everything. In 2023  Still Standing, a Canadian Broadcasting Corporation TV show about "towns that are against the ropes but still hanging in there", featured the city of Morden.

Attractions
The community's recreation hub is the Access Event Centre. The multi-purpose facility houses two indoor arenas, a 1,000-seat community hall, the Manitoba Baseball Hall of Fame, as well as banquet and conference rooms. The lower level of the facility is home to the Canadian Fossil Discovery Centre.

Sports
Morden is home to various ice hockey teams, including the Morden Bombers of the South Eastern Manitoba Hockey League, Morden Thunder of the Manitoba High School Hockey League, and the Pembina Valley Hawks of the Manitoba Female Hockey League.  The 2017 Esso Cup, Canada's national female midget hockey championship, was hosted by the Hawks in Morden.

The Morden Mud Hens are the men's senior baseball team that plays in the Border Baseball League  and captured a provincial title in 2018.

Morden has been the host of the Manitoba Games in its summer and winter editions in 1996 and 2014 respectively.

Government

Morden is governed by a mayor and six councilors who are elected by residents. The current Mayor of Morden is Brandon Burley, who won the 2018 Municipal Election with 1,334 votes (49.17%). Councilor Doug Frost currently serves as Deputy Mayor. Also serving on City of Morden Council are Councilor Gord Maddock, Councilor Garry Hiebert as Corporate Chair-Person, Councilor Hank Hildebrand, Councilor Jim Hunt, and Councilor Nancy Penner as Operations Chair-Person. The City of Morden City Manager has been Nicole Reidle since spring of 2020.

Morden is represented in the Legislative Assembly of Manitoba (as part of the Morden-Winkler riding) by Progressive Conservative MLA Cameron Friesen and in the House of Commons of Canada (as part of the Portage—Lisgar riding) by Conservative MP Candice Bergen.

Infrastructure

Transportation
Roadways in Morden include: Provincial Road 432, Manitoba Provincial Highway 3, Manitoba Highway 14, and Manitoba Highway 75.

Morden is served by a small rural airport, Morden Regional Aerodrome. The city has a taxi service. Greyhound provides a courier service to Morden; passenger service was discontinued. Morden is bisected by the Canadian Pacific railway, running east–west. The Boundary Trail Railway interlines with the Canadian Pacific in Morden.

Education
Morden public schools are part of the Western School Division, which consists of two elementary schools - Maple Leaf Elementary School and Minnewasta Elementary School, one middle school, École Morden Middle School, one high school, Morden Collegiate Institute and an Adult Education centre.

Morden is also home to a branch of Campus Manitoba, providing post-secondary courses from Red River College.

Media
Morden's local newspaper is The Winkler-Morden Voice, also published weekly and distributed by mail to households in both Winkler and Morden and many surrounding smaller communities. A previous paper, The Morden Times, closed in 2020.

Notable people

George Thomas Armstrong, politician
George Ashdown, politician
Jim Barrie, politician
Lillian Beynon Thomas, journalist and feminist
Candice Bergen, politician
Jeff Blair, journalist
John Alton Duncan, judge
Kristen Foster, curler
Cameron Friesen, politician
Henry Friesen, an endocrinologist
Chay Genoway, an ice hockey player for the Hershey Bears
Colby Genoway, hockey player
Keith Hamel, musician
Jake Hoeppner, politician
Charles Holland Locke, judge
John MacAulay, lawyer
Benjamin McConnell, politician
Loreena McKennitt, Celtic musician
Casey Plett, writer
Don Rudd, curler
John Ruddell, politician
Brent Stewart, judge
William Tobias, politician
Howard Winkler, politician
Valentine Winkler, politician
Wooden Sky, band
Taylor Woods, hockey player

References 

 Manitoba Community Profile (2006). Community Profile: Town of Morden. Retrieved December 3, 2007.
 Statistics Canada (2006). 2006 Community Profile: Morden. Retrieved December 3, 2007.
 Western School Division (2007). Western School Division - Modern, Manitoba. Retrieved December 3, 2007.

External links 

 
Cities in Manitoba
Pembina Valley Region